Nehru: The Invention of India is a book written by Shashi Tharoor in 2003. It is a short biography that talks about the life of the first Prime Minister of India. It covers both personal aspects along with the historical and political aspects of India during the time of Pandit Nehru.

On 14 November 2018 on the occasion of Jawaharlal Nehru's birth anniversary,  Tharoor announced that Nehru: The Invention of India will be remade into a web series.

References

2003 non-fiction books
Books about politics of India
Books by Shashi Tharoor
Historiography of India
21st-century Indian books
Jawaharlal Nehru
Arcade Publishing books